Crème chiboust is a crème pâtissière (pastry cream) lightened with Italian meringue. Though occasionally using whipped cream to lighten it, this is traditionally a millefeuille cream.

Crème chiboust can be flavoured with vanilla, orange zest, or liqueurs.

It was supposedly created and developed in 1847 by the pastry chef M. Chiboust of the pastry shop that was located on the Paris street Rue Saint-Honoré.

If gelatin is softened and incorporated to the chiboust or plombieres, it can be used as a Bavarian. The chiboust or the plombieres can also double as soufflé filling, as long as egg whites are the base; the mix will "puff up" and provide a creamy soufflé.

See also
St. Honoré Cake

References

 Cuisine-french.com Full recipe from French Chef
 Professional Baking Fifth Edition, Wayne Gisslen

Custard desserts
French cuisine